Abdollah (also Romanized as ‘Abdollāh; also known as ‘Abdullah) is a village in Dehshir Rural District, in the Central District of Taft County, Yazd Province, Iran. At the 2006 census, its population was 294, in 112 families.

References 

Populated places in Taft County